Rorschach is an American hardcore punk band from New Jersey, United States, that existed from 1989 to 1993 and again from 2009 to 2012. Their typical blend of hardcore with dissonant heavy metal elements provided an inspiration to many later hardcore and post-hardcore bands.

The first release by the band, Remain Sedate, shows the band's sound at a stage when they played fast, heavy hardcore with a metal slant and raspy hardcore vocals. At this time they also drew heavy comparisons to Die Kreuzen for their bizarre chord progressions and Charles Maggio's unearthly howl. However, as the band progressed, they developed a slower, more sinister, sludge sound that was influenced by New York band Swans. Additionally, the vocals developed into high-pitched, tortured screaming rather than shouting, due in part to voice problems Maggio was experiencing at the time. This change in sound can be heard primarily on their second full-length release, Protestant. Shortly after issuing this album, the group disbanded, some members eventually joining Deadguy and Kiss It Goodbye.

Rorschach has performed occasional reunion shows from 2009 through 2012.

Decibel magazine inducted Protestant into their Hall of Fame.

In the 2012 film Zero Dark Thirty, the Rorschach song "Pavlov's Dogs" is used to torture suspected terrorists.

Members
Final line-up
Charles Maggio – vocals (1989–1993, 2009–2012)
Keith Huckins – guitar (1989–1993, 2009–2012)
Nick Forté – guitar (1989–1993, 2009–2012)
Andrew Gormley – drums (1989–1993, 2009–2012)
Tom Rusnak – bass (1991–1993, 2009–2012)

Previous members
Chris Laucella – bass (1989–1991)

Discography

Compilation appearances
God's Chosen People (1993, Old Glory)
Fear of Smell 12" (1993, Vermiform)
Look At All The Children Now (1990, Evacuate)
Forever 7" (1990)

Related bands
 Computer Cougar - Charles Maggio, Nick Forte
 Deadguy - Keith Huckins
 Die 116 - Andrew Gormley
 Kiss It Goodbye - Andrew Gormley, Keith Huckins, Thom Rusnak
 Playing Enemy - Andrew Gormley, Thom Rusnak
 Shai Hulud - Andrew Gormley
 Radio To Saturn - Nick Forte
 Bone of Contention - Keith Huckins, Charles Maggio

References

External links
Gern Blandsten Records - Charles Maggio's record label, including a short biography of Rorschach
Another site on Rorschach
Rorschach - BandToBand.com

Hardcore punk groups from New Jersey
Metalcore musical groups from New Jersey
Powerviolence groups
Heavy metal musical groups from New Jersey
Musical groups established in 1989
Musical groups disestablished in 1993